Houplines is a commune in the Nord department in northern France. It is part of the Métropole Européenne de Lille.

Adjoining the communal (village) cemetery is the Houplines Communal Cemetery Extension, a Commonwealth War Graves Commission maintained cemetery containing the graves of 466 identified casualties, 465 of them Commonwealth servicemen who died in the area around the village during the First World War.

Houplines maintains a partnership arrangement with the German community of Kirchhundem.

Population

Heraldry

See also
Communes of the Nord department

References

External links

Houplines Communal Cemetery Extension

Communes of Nord (French department)
Cemeteries in Nord (French department)
French Flanders